The Secretary of State of New Hampshire is a constitutional officer in the U.S. state of New Hampshire and serves as the exclusive head of the New Hampshire Department of State. The Secretary is third in line for succession as acting Governor of New Hampshire, following the state's President of the Senate and Speaker of the House. The Secretary oversees all state elections, including certifying the results, and keeps the official records of the state. The Secretary is, by statute, the only person who can authorize use of the State Seal.

The Secretary is elected biannually by the New Hampshire General Court (state legislature), as prescribed in the Constitution of New Hampshire as adopted in 1784. The position itself dates to 1680, when the Province of New Hampshire was under British rule.

List of officeholders

See also
 Attorney General of New Hampshire

References

External links
Secretary of State's Website

Secretary of state